Lorraine Carol Minnite is a professor of political science, as well as an associate professor of public policy, at Rutgers University-Camden.

Education
Minnite received her bachelor's degree in history from Boston University, and her masters' and PhD degrees in political science from the City University of New York.

Career
Prior to joining the faculty of Rutgers, Minnite taught at New York University and Barnard College, served as Associate Director of the Center for Urban Research and Policy at Columbia University, and as Research Director for the nonprofit voting rights organization Project Vote.

Work
Minnite's research focuses on issues in American politics, including social justice, political conflict, and institutional change. She has also written two books on election law and racial and class politics in the United States. In a 2009 study co-authored with Robert Erikson, she found inconsistent and weak evidence that voter ID laws reduced turnout. She has argued in her 2010 book, The Myth of Voter Fraud, that voter impersonation is very rare in the United States—in fact, when researching the subject while writing the book, she identified only one case of voter impersonation from 2000 to 2005, involving a teenager in New Hampshire who voted as his father. In the same book, she found that in 2005, the federal government charged far more people with violating migratory bird laws than with committing voter fraud.

Views
Minnite has argued that with respect to voter ID laws, "the costs are very high and the benefits are practically non-existent," and that it does not make sense for illegal immigrants to commit voter fraud because, according to her, "People who are here who are undocumented don't tend to go around trying to, you know, bring attention to themselves, especially doing something that is illegal." She has testified against voter ID laws in Pennsylvania and North Carolina.

References

External links

Living people
Rutgers University–Camden faculty
Boston University College of Arts and Sciences alumni
American women political scientists
American political scientists
City University of New York alumni
Year of birth missing (living people)
21st-century American women